The 2018 Rutgers Scarlet Knights football team represented Rutgers University during the 2018 NCAA Division I FBS football season. The Scarlet Knights played their home games at HighPoint.com Stadium in Piscataway, New Jersey and competed as members of the East Division of the Big Ten Conference. They were led by third-year head coach Chris Ash.

Rutgers began the year with a 35–7 victory over Texas State, but things quickly turned south for the team. After a blowout loss to Ohio State in Rutgers' conference opener, the team traveled to play Kansas, who had lost 39 of their previous 42 games against FBS opponents. Rutgers lost in a blowout, 55–14. The next week, the team was blown out 42–13 by Buffalo of the Mid-American Conference. In the remainder of conference play, the Scarlet Knights were mostly outmatched, losing the rest of their games, despite holding fourth quarter leads in games against Northwestern and Michigan State. Rutgers' final record of 1–11 matched the previous school record for losses in a season with their 1–11 2002 team and 0–11 1997 team.

Freshman quarterback Artur Sitowski led the team in passing, finishing with 1,158 passing yards, 4 touchdowns, and 18 interceptions. Sophomore running back Raheem Blacksheer led the team in both rushing and receiving yards, and had 953 yards from scrimmage on the year. On defense, senior linebacker Trevor Morris finished in sixth in the conference with 105 total tackles. He concluded his career in ninth on the school's all-time leaderboard for total tackles.

Previous season
The Scarlet Knights finished the 2017 season 4–8, 3–6 in Big Ten play to finish in fifth place in the East Division.

Offseason

Recruits

The Scarlet Knights signed a total of 21 recruits.

Award watch lists
Listed in the order that they were released

Schedule

Roster and coaching staff

Game summaries

Texas State

at No. 4 Ohio State

at Kansas

Buffalo

Indiana

Illinois

at Maryland

Northwestern

at Wisconsin

No. 4 Michigan

No. 16 Penn State

at Michigan State

Players drafted into the NFL

References

Rutgers
Rutgers Scarlet Knights football seasons
Rutgers Scarlet Knights football